The Parenting is an upcoming American horror-comedy film directed by Craig Johnson and written by Kent Sublette. It stars Brian Cox, Edie Falco, Lisa Kudrow, Dean Norris, Nik Dodani, Brandon Flynn, Vivian Bang and Parker Posey.

Premise
A young gay couple, Rohan and Josh, host a weekend getaway with their respective parents in a country house rental. Things take a turn when the three couples discover the presence of a 400-year-old evil entity.

Cast
 Nik Dodani as Rohan
 Brandon Flynn as Josh
 Brian Cox
 Edie Falco
 Lisa Kudrow
 Dean Norris
 Parker Posey
 Vivian Bang

Production
On January 26, 2021, New Line Cinema put in development a horror-comedy project written by Kent Sublette, with Craig Johnson attached to direct. The cast was announced in March 2022. After a table read via Zoom on March 19, filming began on March 25, 2022, in Massachusetts.

Release
The film is set to be released on HBO Max.

References

External links
 

American comedy horror films
American LGBT-related films
Demons in film
Films about families
Films shot in Massachusetts
Gay-related films
HBO Max films
LGBT-related comedy horror films
New Line Cinema films
Upcoming English-language films
Upcoming films
Films directed by Craig Johnson
Warner Bros. films